Selo is a small settlement on the right bank of the Krka River west of Podbočje in the Municipality of Krško in eastern Slovenia. The area is part of the traditional region of Lower Carniola. It is now included in the Lower Sava Statistical Region.

References

External links
Selo on Geopedia

Populated places in the Municipality of Krško